= Royal Edinburgh College =

Royal Edinburgh College may refer to:

- Royal College of Physicians of Edinburgh
- Royal College of Surgeons of Edinburgh
